The Mazda2 is a subcompact/supermini (B-segment) car manufactured and marketed by Mazda since 2002, currently in its third generation. An entry-level model of the brand in markets outside Japan, the Mazda2 is positioned below the Mazda3. The Mazda2 has also been marketed as the Mazda Demio (a name it kept in the Japanese market until 2019), while its direct predecessor was exported as the Mazda 121.

The second-generation Mazda2 earned the 2008 World Car of the Year title, while the third-generation model was awarded the 2014–2015 Japanese Car of the Year.

The third-generation model was sold in North America as the Scion iA and Toyota Yaris, Yaris iA and Yaris R.

A separate, petrol-hybrid version based on the Toyota Yaris Hybrid has been sold in Europe under the same Mazda2 nameplate since 2022 alongside the petrol-powered third-generation Mazda2.

Predecessor 

When it came to redesigning the Revue, Mazda came up with a tall hatchback, minivan-esque package. Introduced in a time full of negative press coverage, the Demio became a surprise hit for Mazda in Japan, and also foreshadowed the current crop of B-segment minivans such as the Opel Meriva, Fiat Idea and the Renault Modus. Sold as the 121 in most export markets, the DW's replacement was called the Mazda2 in most of the world. The Demio nameplate, however, continued to be used in Japan until 2019.

The original Demio was introduced in July 1996 and replaced in 2002.

First generation (DY; 2002) 

The second-generation Demio was redesigned in August 2002. The Demio name continued in Japan, while for export markets Mazda dropped the 121 nameplate and other names in favor of "Mazda2". Since its debut, the 2 has been well received by the market, pushing its Japanese domestic sale to as far as seventh place.

Mazda developed the model from the B-segment Ford B3 platform, which is shared with the fifth-generation Ford Fiesta along with components such as suspension design. The development of the model was led by chief engineer Kiyoshi Fujiwara, which also oversaw the development of the B3 platform at Ford's European R&D. Production of the car for European market was consigned to the Almussafes Ford plant in Valencia, Spain since 20 January 2003.

All models are equipped with ABS and EBD, and stability control was optional. An innovative feature offered in Japan is e-4WD, a hybrid car-type system which uses an electric motor to power the rear wheels of this front wheel drive vehicle when needed. In the Demio, this system is used only as a traction aid, not for increased fuel economy as in most other vehicles.

There is also a big difference in floor pan and pedal box. The European-exclusive version of Mazda2 (DY) uses a pedal box directly sourced from Ford Fiesta, with their own 4x108 bolt pattern instead of 4x100.

Three trim levels were available in Japan are Cozy, Sport and Casual.

In Europe, trim levels were S, TS and TS2. The TS and TS2 were renamed Antares and Capella in 2004. The Japanese 1.3 and 1.5 gasoline engines are not available, but Ford's 1.25-liter 16-valve Sigma engine is used, and Mazda's 1.4 and 1.6 gasoline, plus Fords 1.4 TDCi diesel are offered but called 1.4 CDTi by Mazda.

In New Zealand, the Mazda2 was sold with a 1.5 ZY-VE straight-four engine.

In 2004, Mazda introduced the Verisa in Japan. The Verisa is based on the Demio/Mazda2 but was targeted further upmarket.

Engines 
The Mazda2 is sold with a variety of Z-family engines:

Mazda Demio
 1.3 L ZJ-VE I4  at 6000 rpm,  at 3500 rpm
 1.5 L ZY-VE I4  at 6000 rpm,  at 4000 rpm

Mazda2
 1.25 L MZI I4 C2  at 5700 rpm,  at 3500 rpm
 1.4 L MZI I4 C4  at 5700 rpm,  at 3500 rpm
 1.5 L ZY-VE I4  at 6000 rpm,  at 4000 rpm
 1.6 L MZI I4 C6  at 6000 rpm,  at 4000 rpm
 1.4 L MZ-CDTi Diesel I4  at 4000 rpm,  at 2000 rpm

Facelift 
The Demio received its facelift on 13 April 2005.

Second generation (DE/DH; 2007) 

The second-generation Mazda2 was launched at the 2007 Geneva Motor Show, and later at the 2007 Shanghai International Motor Show. It is built on the similar platform to the sixth-generation Ford Fiesta. It employs lightweight materials and reduces the overall dimensions of the car. This generation dropped the high-roof styling adopted by its predecessor, instead opting for a more conventional hatchback look. The lead designer for the second generation Mazda2 (or third generation Demio) was Ikuo Maeda, who was later promoted to Head of Design at Mazda in 2009.

For the Japanese domestic market, sales of the production vehicles began on 5 July 2007 at Mazda, Mazda ɛ̃fini and Autozam dealers. Production in Japan reached 100,000 units at the end of January 2008.

A three-door variant was released for the European market in 2008 at the 2008 Geneva Motor Show. Engine choices include the MZR 1.3-liter and 1.5-liter gasoline, MZ-CD 1.4-liter common-rail turbo diesel. In some European countries such as the Netherlands, there was the option to buy the gasoline car in bi-fuel LPG version from the factory.

The Chinese model of the Mazda2 in five-door hatchback body style launched at the 2007 Guangzhou Motor Show. A Chinese four-door sedan model of the Mazda2 was unveiled at the same event, with sales beginning in January, 2008.

The sedan body style was manufactured in Thailand and China and marketed only in Southeast Asia, Oceania, South America and the Caribbean.

In August 2010, it was reported that 400,000 units has been sold in Europe, Australia and Japan.

Powertrain 
Transmission choices include a five-speed manual, a four-speed automatic, a CVT (only available in Japan and Hong Kong) or a CVT with a sport mode featuring seven simulated ratios and paddle shifters (only available in Japan).

Safety 
The Mazda2 received a "Good" rating from the Insurance Institute for Highway Safety in frontal crashes, "Acceptable" for side crashes, "Good" for roof strength, and "Acceptable" for rear crash protection.

Production 
The vehicles were built in Ujina Plant No.1 (U1) in Hiroshima, with additional Mazda2 began at the Ujina Plant No.2 (U2) in June 2007. Additional vehicles were built in Hofu, Japan.

Chinese models were built in Changan Ford Mazda's Nanjing plant at the end of October 2007.

Asia-Pacific region models were produced by AutoAlliance Thailand beginning in 2009. Mazda2 local assembly in Vietnam began in October 2011 at the Nui Thanh Quang Nam plant owned by Vina Mazda Automobile Manufacturing.

2010 facelift 

The facelifted Mazda2 hatchback was first revealed in Thailand in October 2009, and launched in Thailand and Indonesia in November 2009. The sedan version was also launched in Indonesia in May 2010.

The Mazda2 was launched in Malaysia on 5 April 2010 in sedan and hatchback body styles, and is available in V and R grade levels. It is powered by a 1.5-liter MZR engine paired to a four-speed automatic.

The North American version of the Mazda2 debuted at the 2009 LA Auto Show, and later at the 2010 Canadian International AutoShow. The Mazda2 became available in July 2010 with the 1.5-liter, 100 hp four-cylinder and 5-speed manual or 4-speed automatic transmission. Mazda discontinued the Mazda2 in the United States after the 2014 model year.

In Australia, the sedan was introduced along with the facelifted hatchback in May 2010, with the sedan version being offered in a single 'Maxx' grade. In February 2011, Mazda Australia had reverted to Japanese sourced production, which led to the discontinuation of the sedan being offered after just 9 months on-sale.

2011 update (Japanese models) 
Updated models include premium seat upholstery, black meter panel, silver instrument panel garnish, expanded exterior body colors including Burgundy Red Mica, standard trip computer. The 15C (with CVT), 13C-V and 13C (with a four-speed electronically controlled automatic transmission) models include Mazda's eco-lamp. Sport, 15C, 13C-V and 13C (with e-4WD) model grades include new three-point seatbelt and headrest on the second-row center seat as standard equipment. SPORT model includes 16-inch alloy wheels.

The 13-Skyactiv model includes the first Skyactiv engine, a 1.3-liter with 83 hp (62 kW) and 83 lb·ft (113 N·m) of torque, intelligent-Drive Master (i-DM), CVT transmission, 14-inch alloy wheels, Aquatic Blue Mica exterior body color option, dynamic stability control with brake assist, traction control.

Preorders of the new model began on 9 June 2011, while sales of the new model began on 30 June 2011.

The Demio 13-Skyactiv was nominated for Car of The Year Japan in 2012.

Demio EV (2012) 
The Demio EV is a limited (100 leased units) production electric vehicle for the Japanese market. It includes a 346-Volt 20kWh lithium-ion battery with  driving range. Leasing began in October 2012.

Prototype Range Extender for EV (2013) 
The range extender test car was a version of the Mazda2 prototype electric car with a 0.33-liter rotary engine, lithium-ion batteries, 75 kW electric motor driving front wheels and 10-liter fuel tank. This would double the range of the Demio EV, meeting Japanese requirements that the fuel tank and engine not provide more range than the electric motor. The prototype range extender incorporates a  rotary engine generator, a lightweight  downsized single-rotor Wankel engine with  displacement mounted on its side in the rear of the car.

Third generation (DJ/DL; 2014) 
In July 2014, Mazda unveiled the third-generation Mazda2 hatchback. Its design was previously previewed by the Mazda Hazumi Concept model, which was showcased at the 2014 Geneva Motor Show. Designed under the lead of chief designer Ryo Yanagisawa, the vehicle adopted the "Kodo" design philosophy created by the brand, and built with Skyactiv-branded engines, transmissions, body, and chassis loosely derived from the CX-5. While the model features greater length and wider front and rear tracks, it offers decreased interior room for rear-seat occupants and less front head and legroom.

Production began at Mazda's Hōfu plant in the same month. Sales in Japan began in September 2014. The sedan version debuted at the Thailand International Motor Expo in November 2014.

Production of the Mazda2 for various North and South American markets began in October 2014 at the newly built Mazda de México Vehicle Operation (MMVO) factory in Salamanca, Guanajuato. Despite being produced in North America, Mazda did not sell the vehicle in Canada or the United States (except in Puerto Rico). Instead, the Mazda2 would be sold by Toyota Motor North America in those markets between 2016 and 2020 initially as the Scion iA and later the Toyota Yaris iA and simply Toyota Yaris.

In October 2014, the Demio was awarded the 2014–2015 "Car of the Year" by the Japan Car of the Year Committee.

Facelifts

2019 
The third-generation received a facelift in 2019 with various exterior changes, interior trim changes, revised suspension tuning to improve ride quality, improvements to the engine deceleration energy recovery system, adaptive headlights, and standard G-Vectoring Control Plus. With the facelift model, the Demio nameplate for the Japanese domestic market was renamed into Mazda2 moniker in September 2019.

The facelift model went on sale in Mexico in October 2019 for the 2020 model year. It comes in three versions: i, i Touring, and i Grand Touring with automatic transmission.

2023 
The Mazda2 received a second facelift on 27 January 2023.

Engines and transmission 
The Mazda2 uses Mazda's Skyactiv-Drive six-speed automatic and Skyactiv-MT five- and six-speed manual gearboxes as well as stop-start technology ("i-STOP" turns the engine off when the car is stationary) and a brake energy regeneration system ("i-ELOOP" uses braking to charge a capacitor for all car electronics, in place of an alternator charging a battery).

The Mazda2 was initially offered with a 1.5-liter gasoline engine and a 1.5-liter diesel engine—the Skyactiv-D, 1.5-liter diesel engine debuted at the 2014 Geneva Motor Show. The gasoline engine will be available with 74 bhp, 89 bhp or 113 bhp, while the diesel will produce 104 bhp. The diesel engine was discontinued in Europe in 2019, and an additional 1.5-liter mild hybrid gasoline engine was offered since 2020. The later is only available with 6-speed manual transmission.

Scion iA/Toyota Yaris iA/Toyota Yaris (North America) 
While the Mazda2 is produced in North America at Mazda's plant in Mexico, the company did not sell the vehicle in Canada or the United States (except in Puerto Rico). Instead, the Mazda2 was sold by Toyota Motor North America in those markets between 2015 and 2020. The rebadged Mazdas received different model codes starting with DA, DB, or DD.

In Canada, the vehicle was sold as the Yaris Sedan across all model years. In Mexico, the vehicle was sold as the Yaris R, alongside the larger and lower-priced Yaris Sedán (a variant of the Vios and later the Yaris Ativ). The Yaris R was sold in three versions.

In the United States, the sedan was sold under several names. In the initial 2016 model year, it was marketed under Toyota's youth-oriented Scion brand as the Scion iA, where it was the only 4-door sedan and only model not to be built in Japan to be marketed under the brand. After discontinuing the Scion brand, the car was rebranded as the Toyota Yaris iA for the 2017 and 2018 model years. For the 2019 and 2020 model years, the sedan was rebranded again as the Toyota Yaris Sedan.

When first introduced, like all Scion vehicles, the iA only had one trim level (monospec) and only offered buyers a choice of exterior color and a choice between 6-speed manual and 6-speed automatic transmissions. For 2019, with the Yaris Sedan rebranding, the vehicle received a minor facelift, and L, LE and XLE trim levels were introduced with a variety of interior and exterior options.

The hatchback variant of the Mazda2 was not initially sold by Toyota, which instead offered a Yaris Liftback based on the Toyota Vitz (XP130). After the Vitz was discontinued, a model called the Yaris Hatchback, based on the Mazda2, went on sale in October 2019 for the 2020 model year.

Exports of both the sedan and hatchback to the United States were stopped in June 2020 due to new regulations and slow sales. In July, it was cancelled in the Canadian market. The Mazda2 based Yaris was also discontinued in Mexico on August 27, 2020, leaving only the Thai-imported XP150 series Yaris and Yaris Sedán as its indirect replacements.

Safety 
The Mazda2 has ventilated front disc brakes. It also has seat belts, indicator lights, cushioned dash and windscreen wipers.

Other versions

Toyota Yaris-based model (XP210; 2022) 

The Mazda2 Hybrid based on the XP210 Toyota Yaris Hybrid enters production in December 2021 and went on sale in Europe starting 2022 alongside the older Mazda-built, regular petrol-powered DJ model.

Sales

References

External links 

 Official website (United Kingdom)

2M
Cars introduced in 2002
2010s cars
2020s cars
Front-wheel-drive vehicles
Subcompact cars
Sedans
Hatchbacks
ANCAP superminis
Euro NCAP superminis
Latin NCAP superminis
Hybrid electric cars
Partial zero-emissions vehicles